Metsübo Jamir is a Nationalist Democratic Progressive Party politician from Nagaland. He has been elected in Nagaland Legislative Assembly election in 2018 from Mokokchung Town constituency as candidate of Nationalist Democratic Progressive Party. He was Minister of Rural Development in Fourth Neiphiu Rio ministry from 2018-2023.

References 

Living people
Nationalist Democratic Progressive Party politicians
Nagaland MLAs 2018–2023
Year of birth missing (living people)
People from Mokokchung district